Catalunya is a Spanish Denominación de Origen Protegida (DOP) (Denominació d'Origen Protegida in Catalan) for Catalan wine which was formally recognised in 2001. It was created with the specific purpose of providing commercial support to over 200 wineries (bodegas) that produced quality wine but which were not included in other specific DOP's in Catalonia. It does not have a specific geographical location but is formed by over 40 km² of individual vineyards which are dispersed all over Catalonia, and allows mixing of grapes from other DOPs.

Subregions
For details regarding climate, soil type, wines produced etc., see the other DOP's in Catalonia:
Alella
Cava
Conca de Barberà
Costers del Segre
Empordà
Montsant
Penedès
Pla de Bages
Priorat
Tarragona
Terra Alta

Authorised Grape Varieties
The authorised grape varieties are:

 Red: Cabernet Franc, Cabernet Sauvignon, Garnatxa Negra, Garnatxa Peluda, Garnatxa Roja (Garnatxa Gris), Garnatxa tintorera, Merlot, Monastrell, Petit Verdot, Picapoll Negre, Pinot Noir, Samsó / Carinyena, Sumoll, Sirah, Trepat, Ull de llebre, Xarel·lo Vermell.

 White: Albarinho, Chardonnay, Chenin, Garnatxa Blanca, Gewürtztraminer, Macabeu, Malvasía, Malvasía de Sitges, Moscatell d’Alejandria, Moscatel de Frontignan, Parellada, Pedro Ximénez, Picapoll Blanc, Riesling, Sauvignon Blanc, Sumoll Blanc, Viognier, Vinyater, Xarel·lo

References

External links
 D.O.P. Catalunya official website

Catalan wine
Wine regions of Spain
Spanish wine
Appellations
Wine classification